Myron Lizer is an American politician and businessman and served as the 10th vice president of the Navajo Nation under President Jonathan Nez.

Early life and education 
Lizer was born in Ganado, Arizona. He received his Bachelor of Business Administration from Fort Lewis College.

Career 
Lizer owns an Ace Hardware in Window Rock, Arizona. Lizer is a Baptist Christian and serves as the president of the school board for the Rehoboth Christian School in Rehoboth, New Mexico. Lizer has also written articles for The Santa Fe New Mexican. A Republican and social conservative, he was the running mate of Democrat Jonathan Nez in the 2018 tribal election, which they won with 66% of the vote. 

He is a supporter of former president Donald Trump and spoke at the 2020 Republican National Convention, highlighting Trump's achievements for tribal communities, particularly on the issues of Missing and Murdered Indigenous People and the COVID-19 pandemic. He also joined Franklin Graham at the 2020 Prayer March in Washington D.C., praying for the country at the World War II Memorial. In October 2020, he joined Donald Trump Jr., Carlyle Begay, and others in launching the Native Americans for Trump coalition in Williams, Arizona.

Lizer announced in March 2022 that he would run for Arizona's 2nd congressional district in the 2022 election, but did not earn enough signatures to file.

Personal life 
Lizer is half Navajo through his father's side and half Comanche through his mother's side; he is of the Naałání (Comanche People Clan) born for Tó’áhání (Near The Water Clan), his maternal grandfather's clan is Naałání (Comanche People Clan), and paternal grandfather's clan is Tł’ááshchí’í (Red Cheek People).

See also
 List of Native American politicians

References

Living people
20th-century Native Americans
21st-century Native Americans
Arizona Republicans
Baptists from Arizona
Fort Lewis College alumni
Christians from Arizona
Comanche people
Native American Christians
Navajo people
People from Apache County, Arizona
People from Ganado, Arizona
People from McKinley County, New Mexico
Vice Presidents of the Navajo Nation
Year of birth missing (living people)